Jingle Jangle or jingle-jangle may refer to:

Music
 Jangle, a sound associated with 12-string electric guitars

Songs 
 "Jingle Jangle" (The Archies song), 1969
 "Jingle Jangle" (Bee Gees song), 1966
 "Jingle Jangle", a song by the Penguins
 "Jingle Jangle", a 1969 song by the Troggs
 "Jingle Jangle", a 1969 song by Manuela
 "Jingle Jangle", a 2003 song by Hieroglyphics from the album Full Circle
 "Jingle Jangle", a 2005 song by Hot Hot Heat from the album Elevator

Album 
 Jingle Jangle (The Archies album), a 1969 album by The Archies

Television and film
 "Ed, Edd n Eddy's Jingle Jingle Jangle", TV episode of "Ed, Edd n Eddy"
 Jingle Jangle (film), 2020 film

Miscellaneous
 Jingle Jangle Comics
 Jingle-jangle fallacies
 The sound of bells

See also

 "Jingle Jangle Jingle", a 1942 song
 Jingle (disambiguation)
 Jangle (disambiguation)